The Center for Population Economics (or CPE) is a research center at the University of Chicago Booth School of Business. The work of the CPE is funded primarily by the U.S.'s National Institute on Aging of the National Institutes of Health.

Population Growth and Economic Development

Introduction

The relationship existing between population growth and economic development is one of the subject areas which scholars have explored extensively[1]. The current prediction from researchers is that, various high-income countries are likely to experience slow population growth. On the other hand, it is feared that population growth has always been a problem and will continue to be a challenge as long as people continue to depend on the limited natural resources available [2]. This will eventually affect long-term economic development. Population growth affects various aspects including international migration, population age structure, the size of the workforce and economic inequality. These factors are critical factors that determine economic growth of any nation. Additionally, they are also affected by economic depending on the number of people living in a particular country. The effects of population can be determined in terms of GDP and per capita output.

One of the famous authors whose theory has been used in assessing economic growth is Thomas Malthus. According to the author population growth would at some point suppress living standards in the long term. In order to put the theory in to perspective, he used the quantity of fixed land[3]. If the population continues to grow and the people still uses the same amount of land, then the amount of resources consumed will definitely reduce. This will eventually lead to starvation, war and diseases. He further provided a solution for this problem by suggesting that, these adverse effects of population growth could only be avoided if the people could from moral restraint that is by restraining from having several children. At the time this assumption was being made, the author did not put in to consideration future technological developments that have been used in reducing infectious diseases and improve agricultural production. For this reason, the world population has continued to grow despite the fear that it would have depleted all the available resource[4]. However, from his point of view it is clear that population growth has potential detrimental to economic development and this has been the basis for formulation of international policies towards curbing excess population growth in different parts of the world especially in developing nations.

Malthusian Theory

According to Malthus, population growth at some point must collide with shrinking returns [5]. It is all about arithmetic food supply and exponential population where increase in population and food supply can be balanced through the establishment of positive checks and preventive measures[6]. Malthusian theory consists of various elements that have been put forward to help with further understanding of the relationship between population growth and economic development. Even though the theory tries to put different aspect of population growth and economic development in to perspective, it does not cover every factor as it did not consider the fact that technology could be used to improve food production and reduce prevalence of diseases around the world.

i.               Preventive Checks

The theory suggests that encouraging things like self-control, late marriage and simple living would be helpful in balancing food supply and population growth[7]. Balancing the relationship between population growth and economic development requires the establishment and implementation of policies and measures that improve living standards of the people.

ii.             Positive Checks

According to this theory, population control is left to nature as it has its own way of weeding population. When nature comes in to control population, it takes the population level back to a size where the available food supply can sustain it [8]. Nature controls population through earthquakes, famine, wars, flood and epidemics among others. The role of nature is to control population when it is beyond control y other measures that have been established.

           iii          Population and Food Supply

According to Malthusian theory, population growth takes place in a geometrical fashion. When population growth takes place, food supply decreases and this is always an indicator of more people depending on the same amount of resources[9]. It basically means that food supply will be diminishing due to strains put on the available resources. When population increases and the number resources available remains the same, it basically means will have to struggle to get food.

            iv         Checks on Population

Disequilibrium exists the rate at which population increase is higher than that of food supply. As a result, lack of enough food will cause deaths as there would be not enough food for people to survive on[10]. Coupling inadequate food supply with natural adversities of positive checks, at some point population will be reduced.

The Optimum Theory of Population

The theory focusses on establishing a relationship between creation of wealth and the size of the population [11]. Compared to Malthusian theory, optimum theory of population is more realistic. Optimum population suggests that, if the ideal population of a country id combined with necessary means and resources, the manufacturing industry will yield the most output or income per capita[12]. Other authors who have expanded on the theory have defined it differently. According to Robbins, the best population is that size that makes the most returns[13]. Carr-Saunders on the other hand define the theory as population which yields the most economic welfare[14]. Lastly, Dalton viewed it optimum theory as population which gives the most income per capita[15]. Considering all the definition that have been given by these authors, optimum population is basically an ideal population size which can achieve the most income per if the available resources are properly utilized. However, if the population increases or decreases below the ideal size, then the maximum returns will diminish [16]. According to this theory, in case population increase is followed by per capita income increase, then the country has low population. It therefore means that, it can still afford population increase until the optimum level. On the other hand, if decrease in per capita happens as a result of population increase then the country is overpopulated and there is need for population reduction in order to achieve maximum income per head.

The Theory of Demographic Transition

The theory in question has focused mainly on the real population trends of developed countries. In this theory, population development is a three-stage process which these countries go through. In the first phase of population growth, the death is high while birth is low hence low population growth. In the second phase, death decreases while birth remains the same. Due to this the rate of population growth increases [17]. However, in the last phase of population growth, death rates equals birth rates. This is as a result of a steady decline in the rate at which children are born. Unlike Malthusian theory, demographic transition has not dwelt on food supply and does not take opportunity to give population growth any negativity.

Population Growth

Population growth is characterized by both positive and negative impacts on economic development[18]. The rapid population growth is basically experienced in developing countries with an average increases of 2.2 percent annually while others record as high as 3 percent per year. The 1950s development economists were not keen on population control policies. Their major interests were on theories that could be used to dramatically raise total output by investing in crash programs. On the other hand, they partly believed that changes in the population growth could be controlled through values and social attitudes. However, the scholars and researchers have realized that population growth is a complicated matter and developing nations are even experiencing unwanted births.

Different birth control strategies and policies have been implemented to curb population growth which have been successful in some nations while others are still grappling with this problem. However, there are numerous challenges associated with population control through birth control especially because of the attitude that people have on this strategy[19]. Population growth has complications of its own withstanding the fact that it can be exploited strategically to achieve economic development in every country. Balancing between population growth and economic development requires different strategies and policies supported by different agencies including national government. Different approaches have been presented to explain the relationship between population growth and economic development.

Expansion of Domestic Industry

The development of domestic industry depends on the amount of labor available in a country. For the manufacturing sector to expand, population growth is fundamental [20]. It is one of the sectors in the economy that draws in a lot of workers in any country. Labor force is fundamental in any economic development and nations require population growth for that. Just like manufacturing industry, agriculture sector is also dependent on population growth[21]. With most developing countries grappling with the reality of excess population growth, a number of issues are cropping up that needs to be dealt. For instance, the manufacturing industry would have siphoned some of the labor force but as population continues to increase, unemployment becomes a problem[22]. This means that at some point, there comes a need to either control population growth or find new ways of creating more jobs for the unemployed individuals. The aspect of population growth is complicated since in one hand it is good for economic growth while on the other hand its negative effects put strain on natural resources, social amenities and leads to environmental degradation [23]. The fact is manufacturing industry will definitely expand as a result of population growth but at the end of the day, when there is need for more resources, the community will struggle to survive due to straining that are put on available resources.

Complications of Rapid Population Growth

Rapid population growth comes with different complications. First of all, it leads to reduced investment. As a result of increased and rapid consumption of income, future investments becomes a challenge as there are not enough savings [24]. The second challenge that comes with increase in population is overuse of resources. An increase in the number of people depending on resources leads to overexploitation of resources. This s because, the demand for commodities increases and this requires manufacturing industry to source for raw materials hence overuse of resources[25]. Rapid population growth also comes with urbanization challenges. Planning for housing and provision of social amenities such as transport, water and water among others becomes difficult. It also leads to retarded income per in three different ways [26]. Firstly, it puts more pressure on of the increasing population on land. Additionally, it leads to inflation of consumption goods which results into a strain on family income. Furthermore, population increase affects income per capita as it declines capital accumulation as family expenses cannot allow the family to save more [27]. Such consequences are what causes a decline in the standard of living of the people in a country. This is because, if population increases and income does not increase, it means that standard of living have to decrease as the little amount earned has to be used in taking care of everybody[28]. Other complications of rapid population growth include unemployment, scarcity of social infrastructure, environmental damage and reduced investment.

Conclusion

Most countries around the world are struggling with the complications of increased population growth ranging from unemployment to scarcity of social amenities. These problems have persisted as population continues to increase [29]. Somehow, it seems like the measures and policies that have been implemented have failed in curbing population growth. Most developing countries are affected by the intensity of population and understanding their predicament through the theories of population growth is in no way helping their cases[30]. As a matter of fact, population growth is still expected in most parts of the world and this will continue to impact on economic development. However, in the same manner population growth affects economic development, it is the same way economic development can lead to increased population growth[31]. Favorable economic development makes it easier for population growth as services such as health care, food supply and other necessities are available. Population growth remains an important factor of economic development since resources cannot be utilized on their own without the input of human capital.

References

Ahmad, M., & Khan, R. E. A. (2019). Does demographic transition with human capital dynamics matter for economic growth? A dynamic panel data approach to GMM. Social Indicators       Research, 142(2), 753–772.

Amundsen, E. S., & Skonhoft, A. (2022). Impatience to Consume and Population Growth in a Simple Agrarian Economy (No. 2022/01). IFRO Working Paper.

Baldassare, M. (2020). The growth dilemma. In The Growth Dilemma. University of California Press.

Chen, X., & Fu, F. (2018). Social learning of prescribing behavior can promote population optimum of antibiotic use. Frontiers in Physics, 6, 139.

Dasgupta, P., & Beard, S. J. (2021). Optimum Population and Environmental Constraints–A Utilitarian Perspective3. CLIMATE ETHICS, 193.

Enflo, K. (2022). Measuring Social Welfare by Proximity to an Optimum Population. Pacific Philosophical Quarterly.

Geissdoerfer, M., Savaget, P., Bocken, N. M., & Hultink, E. J. (2017). The Circular Economy–A new sustainability paradigm?. Journal of cleaner production, 143, 757-768.

Hashmi, R., & Alam, K. (2019). Dynamic relationship among environmental regulation,  innovation,  emissions, population, and economic growth in OECD countries: A panel investigation. Journal of cleaner production, 231, 1100–1109.

Prosekov, A. Y., & Ivanova, S. A. (2018). Food security: The challenge of the present. Geoforum, 91, 73–77.

King, J. E. (2019). Hugh Dalton (1887–1962). In The Palgrave Companion to LSE  Economics (pp. 289–310). Palgrave Macmillan, London.

Oladimeji, Y. U. (2017). Food production trend in Nigeria and Malthus theory of population: empirical evidence from rice production. Nigerian Journal of Agriculture, Food and  Environment, 13(1), 126–132.

Okunolа, A. M., Nathaniel, S. P., & Festus, V. B. (2018). Revisiting population growth and food production nexus in Nigeria: an ARDL approach to cointegration. Agricultural and Resource Economics: International Scientific E-Journal, 4(1868-2019-383), 41–51.

Riva, F., Ahlborg, H., Hartvigsson, E., Pachauri, S., & Colombo, E. (2018). Electricity access  and rural development: Review of complex socio-economic dynamics and causal diagrams for more appropriate energy modelling. Energy for Sustainable   Development, 43, 203–223.

Robbins, L., & Howson, S. (2018). Lionel Robbins on the principles of economic analysis: the  1930s lectures. Routledge.

Rukmana, D. (2018, March). Rapid urbanization and the need for sustainable transportation policies in Jakarta. In IOP conference series: earth and environmental science (Vol. 124,

No. 1, p. 012017). IOP Publishing.

Sakanko, M. A., & David, J. (2018). An Econometric Validation of Malthusian Theory:   Evidence in Nigeria. Signifikan: Jurnal Ilmu Ekonomi, 7(1), 77–90.

Smil, V. (2001). Feeding the world: A challenge for the twenty-first century. MIT press.

Unat, E. (2020). A review of Malthusian theory of population under the scope of human   capital. FORCE: Focus on Research in Contemporary Economics, 1(2), 132–147.

[1] Geissdoerfer et al., 2017

[2] Smil, 2001

[3] Geissdoerfer et al., 2017

[4] Smil, 2001

[5] Unat, 2020

[6] Oladimeji, 2017

[7] Sakanko & David, 2018

[8] Oladimeji, 2017

[9] Unat, 2020

[10] Okunola et al., 2018

[11] Enflo, 2022

[12] Dasgupta & Beard, 2021

[13] Robbins & Howson, 2018

[14] Amundsen & Skonhoft, 2022

[15] King, 2019

[16] Chen & Fu, 2018

[17] Ahmad & Khan, 2019

[18] Riva et al., 2018

[19] Rive et al., 2018

[20] Hashmi & Alam, 2019

[21] Prosekov & Ivanova, 2018

[22] Hashmi & Alam, 2019

[23] Hashmi & Alam, 2019

[24] Rukmana, 2018

[25] Rukmana, 2018

[26] Baldassare, 2020

[27] Baldassare, 2020

[28] Rukmana, 2018

[29] Ahmad & Khan, 2019

[30] Enflo, 2020

[31] Hashmi & Alam, 2019

Research institutes of the University of Chicago